Volcán Suchitán is a stratovolcano located in Santa Catarina Mita, Jutiapa, Guatemala.

See also
 List of volcanoes in Guatemala

References 
 

Mountains of Guatemala
Volcano
Stratovolcanoes of Guatemala